Kurt Sohn (born June 26, 1957 in Ithaca, New York) is a former professional American football player who played wide receiver for eight seasons for the New York Jets from 1981 to 1988. After growing up in Huntington (New York) and excelling in both football and lacrosse, he graduated from Huntington High School (New York) in 1975. He went to Fordham and Nassau Community College. He finished his professional career with 79 receptions for 1,018 yards and 10 touchdowns. He was a valuable special teams player as well, serving as both a punt and kick returner. He had 68 PRs for 519 yards and 63 KRs for 1,164 yards. 

Kurt Sohn is currently married and lives in Palm Beach Gardens, FL. He has three daughters, Kerri, April and Wendy, with his first wife and a son with his current wife.

1957 births
Living people
Sportspeople from Ithaca, New York
American football wide receivers
Fordham Rams football players
NC State Wolfpack football players
New York Jets players
Nassau Lions football players
Nassau Community College alumni